The Gudenus cave is an archaeological site near the city of Krems in north-eastern Austria. It is noted for its fossils and remains of Palaeolithic  human settlers.

Description
The site is close to the River Danube.

Paleontology
The archaeological deposit has yielded bones of numerous animals, including Woolly mammoth, Woolly rhinoceros, Aurochs, Chamois, Reindeer, and Red deer. Human artifacts include numerous flint implements beginning with the Mousterian (i.e. Neanderthals) of the Middle Paleolithic, although there is no certainty as to the dating. There is also an Upper Palaeolithic, Magdalenian, assemblage including an engraved reindeer bone, and a fragment of a bone flute dated to about 16,000–10,000 BCE.

References

External links

Archaeological sites in Austria
Caves of Austria
Neanderthal sites
Mousterian